Cheirodendron is a genus of flowering plant in the family Araliaceae.  All six species in the genus are endemic to Polynesia. The five Hawaiian species are generally called ōlapa, and occur in wet forests on all major islands as well as some mesic forests, such as Kipuka Puaulu.

Species
Cheirodendron bastardianum (Decaisne) Frodin (Marquesas Islands) (= C. marquesense)
Cheirodendron dominii  Kraj. Kauai
Cheirodendron fauriei Hochr. (Kauai)
Cheirodendron forbesii (Sherff) Lowry (Kauai)
Cheirodendron platyphyllum (Hook. & Arn.) Seem. - Lapalapa (Oahu, Kauai)
C. platyphyllum ssp. kauaiense
C. platyphyllum ssp. platyphyllum
Cheirodendron trigynum (Gaudich.) A.Heller  (main islands of Hawaii)
C. trigynum ssp. helleri
C. trigynum ssp. trigynum

References

External links

Araliaceae
Apiales genera